Leon F. Wheatley (February 20, 1872 – December 19, 1944) was an American politician from New York.

Life
He was born on February 20, 1872, in West Franklin, Armstrong County, Pennsylvania, the son of William Wheatley. He became a dry goods merchant in Hornell, New York. On May 17, 1898, he married Mary Elizabeth Burt (born 1871).

Wheatley was a member of the New York State Assembly (Steuben Co., 2nd D.) in 1922, 1923, 1924, 1925 and 1926; a member of the New York State Senate (43rd D.) from 1927 to 1932, sitting in the 150th, 151st, 152nd, 153rd, 154th and 155th New York State Legislatures; and Mayor of Hornell from 1934 to 1937.

He died on December 19, 1944, in Hornell, New York; and was buried at the Rural Cemetery in Hornellsville.

References

1872 births
1944 deaths
Republican Party New York (state) state senators
People from Hornell, New York
Republican Party members of the New York State Assembly
Mayors of places in New York (state)
People from Armstrong County, Pennsylvania